(Autumn song), WAB 73, is a romantic song composed by Anton Bruckner in 1864. The song, scored for men's choir and two soprano soloists with piano accompaniment, depicts an autumn walking with nightingale song.

History 
Bruckner composed the song on a text of Friedrich von Sallet on 19 March 1864.

Bruckner dedicated the song to his friend Josef Hafferl, chairman of the Liedertafel Frohsinn.

A copy of the work, of which the original manuscript is lost, is stored in the archive of the Liedertafel Frohsinn.

Text 

Herbstlied is using a text by Friedrich von Sallet.

Music 
The 69-bar long work in F-sharp minor is scored for  choir, two soprano soloists and piano. Strophe 1 is sung by the men's choir. Strophe 2 (from bar 17) is sung by the two soprano soloists, who are figuring the song of the nightingales, with accompaniment of the men's choir. Strophe 3 is sung again by the men's choir. Strophe 4, which is sung again by the two soprano soloists with accompaniment of the men's choir, is ending pianissimo.

Discography 

The first recording of Herbstlied was by Theodor Rehmann with the Aachener Domchor in 1938 – 78 rpm: Electrola EG 6530 (transcription for choir)

There is a single other recording:
 Thomas Kerbl, Quartet of the Männerchorvereinigung Bruckner 08, Regina Riel & Katharina Lyashenko (soprano soloists), Mariko Onishi (piano), Anton Bruckner – Männerchöre – CD: LIVA027, 2008 (men's choir replaced by a men's vocal quartet)

References

Sources 
 August Göllerich, Anton Bruckner. Ein Lebens- und Schaffens-Bild,  – posthumous edited by Max Auer by G. Bosse, Regensburg, 1932
 Anton Bruckner – Sämtliche Werke, Band XXIII/2:  Weltliche Chorwerke (1843–1893), Musikwissenschaftlicher Verlag der Internationalen Bruckner-Gesellschaft, Angela Pachovsky and Anton Reinthaler (Editor), Vienna, 1989
 Cornelis van Zwol, Anton Bruckner 1824–1896 – Leven en werken, uitg. Thoth, Bussum, Netherlands, 2012. 
 Uwe Harten, Anton Bruckner. Ein Handbuch. , Salzburg, 1996. .
 Crawford Howie, Anton Bruckner - A documentary biography, online revised edition

External links 
 
 Hebstlied fis-Moll, WAB 73 – Critical discography by Hans Roelofs 
 A digitalisation of Rehmann's historical performance of Herbstlied can be heard on John Berky's website

Weltliche Chorwerke by Anton Bruckner
1864 compositions
Compositions in F-sharp minor